Vasile Alexandru (born 18 July 1935) is a Romanian former football midfielder who played for Romania in the 1960 European Nations' Cup.

Honours
Dinamo București
Divizia A: 1961–62, 1962–63
Cupa României: 1958–59
Dinamo Pitești
Divizia B: 1962–63
Universitatea Cluj
Cupa României: 1964–65
CFR Cluj
Divizia B: 1968–69

Notes

References

External links

1935 births
Romanian footballers
Romania international footballers
Association football midfielders
Liga I players
Liga II players
FCM Bacău players
FC Argeș Pitești players
FC Universitatea Cluj players
CFR Cluj players
FC Dinamo București players
Living people